Lieutenant General John Lawrence Whitham,  (7 October 1881 – 12 May 1952) was a senior officer in the Australian Army who held senior commands in the 1930s and early 1940s.

References

1881 births
1952 deaths
Australian Companions of the Distinguished Service Order
Australian Companions of the Order of St Michael and St George
Australian generals
Australian military personnel of the Second Boer War
Australian military personnel of World War I
Military personnel of British India
Australian Army personnel of World War II
Volunteer Defence Corps officers
Graduates of the Staff College, Camberley